Manṣūr Zalzal al-Ḍārib (منصور زلزل; died after 842 CE) or simply Zalzal, was an Iranian musician during the early Abbasid period. The renowned musician Ishaq al-Mawsili was his student; he declared Zalzal to be the most outstanding lutenist of his time.

He contributed musical scales that were later named after him (the Mansouri scale, Arabic, المقياس المنصوري) and introduced positions (intervals) within scales on the fretboard of an oud (neutral 3rd frets, between major 3rd frets and minor third frets), called wasati-zalzal. Mansour is credited by the Encyclopedia of Islam with making improvements on the design of the barbat lute, which was then called the ūd shabbūt.

References

Arabic-language singers
Year of death unknown
Year of birth unknown
Musicians from the Abbasid Caliphate